Chanute is a city in Neosho County, Kansas, United States.  Founded on January 1, 1873, it was named after railroad engineer and aviation pioneer Octave Chanute.  As of the 2020 census, the population of the city was 8,722.  Chanute is home of Neosho County Community College.

History

In 1870 when the Leavenworth, Lawrence & Galveston Rail Road (later the Atchison, Topeka & Santa Fe, now the BNSF Railway) crossed the Missouri, Kansas and Texas line within the limits of Neosho county four rival towns sprang up, in the vicinity of the junction: New Chicago, Chicago Junction, Alliance, and Tioga. Two years of the most bitter animosity ensued until the four were consolidated in 1872, and the name of Chanute given it in honor of Octave Chanute, a railroad civil engineer.

Settlers had begun populating the area as early as 1856. With the LL&G Railroad set to arrive shortly thereafter, the early residents of the towns of Tioga, Chicago Junction, Alliance, and New Chicago needed an innovative solution to an escalating dispute over which town would claim the right to house the LL&G Railroad's new land office. The towns were unable to settle their differences until an individual by the name of Octave Chanute came to town. Octave was the Chief Engineer and General Superintendent of the LL&G Railroad.  In 1872, he suggested the towns merge to end the bickering.  On January 1, 1873 the towns merged and became Chanute.

With the Southern Kansas Railroad locating a division headquarters in Chanute, the city began to flourish. In 1887, Chanute boasted a rapid growth in flourmills, grain elevators, banks, drug and hardware stores, and natural gas. In 1903, the City of Chanute established the electric utility, and in the years to follow, established the gas, water, wastewater, refuse utilities.  Ash Grove Cement Company, the sixth largest cement manufacturer in North America, commenced cement manufacture in 1908 in Chanute.  In September 2011 Spirit AeroSystems announced the expansion of an assembly facility which will grow to 150 employees in five years and boost the local economy.

Geography

Climate

According to the Köppen Climate Classification system, Chanute has a humid subtropical climate, abbreviated "Cfa" on climate maps.

Demographics

2010 census
As of the census of 2010, there were 9,119 people, 3,720 households, and 2,322 families residing in the city. The racial makeup of the city was 92.4% White, 1.9% African American, 1.2% Native American, 0.8% Asian, 0.1% Pacific Islander, 1.4% from other races, and 2.2% from two or more races. Hispanic or Latino of any race were 5.4% of the population.

There were 3,720 households, of which 32.4% had children under the age of 18 living with them, 44.1% were married couples living together, 12.6% had a female householder with no husband present, 5.7% had a male householder with no wife present, and 37.6% were non-families. 33.1% of all households were made up of individuals, and 15.1% had someone living alone who was 65 years of age or older. The average household size was 2.35 and the average family size was 2.93.

The median age in the city was 37.2 years. 25.3% of residents were under the age of 18; 10.5% were between the ages of 18 and 24; 23% were from 25 to 44; 24.5% were from 45 to 64; and 16.8% were 65 years of age or older. The gender makeup of the city was 48.0% male and 52.0% female.

2000 census
As of the census of 2000, there were 9,411 people, 3,864 households, and 2,496 families residing in the city. The population density was 1,533.7 people per square mile (591.8 per km2). There were 4,262 housing units at an average density of 694.6 per square mile (268.0 per km2). The racial makeup of the city was 93.20% White, 1.42% African American, 1.11% Native American, 0.47% Asian, 0.04% Pacific Islander, 1.39% from other races, and 2.37% from two or more races. Hispanic or Latino of any race were 3.89% of the population.

There were 3,864 households, out of which 30.6% had children under the age of 18 living with them, 49.9% were married couples living together, 10.8% had a female householder with no husband present, and 35.4% were non-families. 31.7% of all households were made up of individuals, and 16.1% had someone living alone who was 65 years of age or older. The average household size was 2.34 and the average family size was 2.92.

In the city, the population was spread out, with 25.2% under the age of 18, 10.1% from 18 to 24, 25.2% from 25 to 44, 20.5% from 45 to 64, and 18.9% who were 65 years of age or older. The median age was 38 years. For every 100 females, there were 88.0 males. For every 100 females age 18 and over, there were 84.8 males.

The median income for a household in the city was $29,912, and the median income for a family was $36,630. Males had a median income of $25,696 versus $17,938 for females. The per capita income for the city was $16,288. About 12.0% of families and 15.0% of the population were below the poverty line, including 20.3% of those under age 18 and 9.9% of those age 65 or over.

Education

Colleges
Chanute's only college is the Neosho County Community College known locally as NCCC, or sometimes as NC3. Neosho County Community College is a public, two-year institution, that currently provides post-secondary education for just under 3,200 students.

Primary and secondary
The community is served by Chanute USD 413 public school district, which includes one elementary school, one middle school, and one high school. Chanute Elementary School is the city's elementary school, Royster Middle School is the city's middle school, and Chanute High School is the city's high school. Chanute's public school system also includes Chanute High School-affiliated New Beginnings Academy, a program for students lacking credits to graduate and designed for individuals who have dropped out or are in danger of dropping out of high school. High school credits for New Beginnings Academy are provided by Chanute High School.

In 1961 Chanute had at least 3 elementary schools, Alcot, Murray Hill and James B Hutton.  Alcot was located in the northwest section of Chanute in the vicinity of Highland Park.  Murray Hill was located on 3rd Street bounded on the East by Garfield Avenue.  It is now listed in the National Register of Historic Places also is a senior living home.  The front of James B. Hutton was located on Ashby Avenue on the west side and Katy Avenue on the east side between 6th and 7th Streets.  It is currently used as a religious center noted by web maps.

Chanute is home to two private schools: Saint Patrick Catholic School and Chanute Christian Academy. Saint Patrick Catholic School provides schooling for students from pre-school (ages three to four) through the sixth grade while Chanute Christian Academy (CCA) provides schooling for students from kindergarten through the twelfth grade. The Kansas State Department of Education (KSDE) recognizes Saint Patrick Catholic School as an accredited, non-public school.  Chanute Christian Academy is not listed as an accredited school on the KSDE website.

Area attractions

The Chanute area has many tourist attractions known for their historical significance.

Martin and Osa Johnson Safari Museum
The Martin and Osa Johnson Safari Museum offers exhibits and programs that highlight the achievements of Martin and Osa Johnson, pioneering documentary filmmakers, photographers, authors, explorers, and Kansans. A trip to the museum allows one to relive the Johnsons' 1917–1936 adventures in Africa, Borneo and the South Seas.  Additional exhibits feature the cultures and art of West Africa.

The Tioga Suites Hotel 
The Tioga Suites Hotel, on the National Register of Historic Places listings in Neosho County, Kansas as the Tioga Inn, was built in 1929 boasting "modern fireproof construction" consisting of concrete framing, ceramic block fire walls, firehose connections on each floor, fire extinguishers and even "complete fire fighting apparatus" in the roof-top elevator penthouse.  It is located on the northeast corner of Lincoln and Main Streets.  It has been remodeled and modernized. Currently, it operates as the Tioga Hotel, the largest hotel in town.

Chanute Art Gallery
The Chanute Art Gallery includes more than 1,500 square feet of exhibit area and houses a Permanent Core Collection of more than 500 works of art that includes 25 mediums, representing 135 artists. Special exhibits change every month. Collections include: The Luigi Kasimir Etchings, European and Oriental Art, The Kansas Prairie Printmakers and local and area artists.

Chanute Historical Museum
The Chanute Historical Museum, run by the Chanute Historical Society, is located south of the historic Santa Fe Railroad Depot in what is commonly known as the Flat Iron Building.  Exhibits include a replica of Octave Chanute's 1896 biplane glider that was once displayed at the Smithsonian Institution in Washington, DC, historic artifacts from the Santa Fe Railroad and the Harvey House restaurant, and more.

Downtown & Historic Homes
Both the downtown and historic home districts offer a variety of architectural styles and examples of restoration. The James and Ella Truitt House, located at 305 N. Steuben Ave., was listed on the National Register of Historic Places listings in Neosho County, Kansas in 2014.  Chanute also has several examples of WPA projects.

Cardinal Drug Store
The Cardinal Drug Store in downtown Chanute is the home of one of the oldest original soda fountains in Kansas.  It has a collection of Coke memorabilia and medicine bottles.  Cardinal is located at 103 East Main Street.

Austin Bridge
The King Bridge Company constructed the Austin Bridge in 1872. The 160-foot bowstring arch design spanned the Neosho River east of what is now Chanute. Local pioneers invested $15,000 in the bridge for their economic future of getting livestock and crops to the railhead. In 1910 the bridge was moved downstream to the community of Austin. In 1972 it was closed to vehicular traffic, remaining open to foot traffic. On September 15, 1977 the bridge was added to the National Register of Historic Places. In August 1999 the bridge was moved into Santa Fe Park to become the southern terminus of a 3.11 mile hike/bike path. A Federal grant, Neosho County and the City of Chanute funded the project.

Summit Hill Gardens
Summit Hill Gardens was the first school in Neosho County.  Summit Hill was restored and a historic home and modern structure were added to the family residence.  It has a flower and herb garden.  It is located at 2605 160th Road.

Chanute–Wright Brothers Memorial
Located at 1 West Main, this sculpture was dedicated in September 2003 by the Chanute High School Class of 1941. The sculpture honors engineer and city namesake, Octave Chanute, a railroad designer who built the railroad through the town (now next to the memorial site), and whose work inspired the Wright Brothers.  The replica sculpture of the Wright Brothers plane measures 23 feet from wing tip to wing tip and 20 feet from nose to tail.    The project was in partnership with the City of Chanute.

Transportation

Highways
Major highways running through Chanute are north–south route US-169 and east–west route K-39 (East-West). Chanute is also within 10 miles of two other major north–south highways: US-75 and US-59. These highways provide easy access to I-70 and I-35, the two Interstate highways passing through Kansas, as well as east–west highway US-400.

Bus
Bus service is provided northward towards Kansas City, Missouri and southward towards Tulsa, Oklahoma by Jefferson Lines (subcontractor of Greyhound Lines).

Railways
The South Kansas and Oklahoma Railroad (SKO) serves Chanute, as well as Southern and Eastern Kansas and Northern Oklahoma. The SKO connects to several major railroads allowing local businesses the opportunity to bid and negotiate their rail transportation costs to acquire the best possible price to all locations throughout North America.

Airports
Chanute Martin Johnson Airport (FAA Identifier: CNU) is a general aviation airport with a 4,255-foot runway and taxiway. Expansion of services and infrastructure is in the planning stages, including new T-hangars and pavement improvements.

Infrastructure
In October 2014, the City of Chanute announced it planned to establish a municipal-operated broadband network, offering 1 Gigabit Internet connectivity for about US$40 per month. AT&T, which currently offers only 6 megabit DSL service to the town (at a higher price), filed a petition with the Kansas Corporation Commission to intervene in the city's proposed offering, arguing it has the right to intervene since a 1947 law requires the Commission to approve any bond issue the city would use to finance the construction.
In April 2015, incoming city commissioners voted not to issue bonds and to temporarily halt the plans on municipal operated broadband, pending further public discussion and a public vote

Notable people

 Eden Ahbez (1908–1995), songwriter and mystic, lived in Chanute in his youth as George McGrew
 Jimmy Allen, former lead guitarist for Puddle of Mudd 
 Gilbert Baker, LGBT activist, created the rainbow flag 
 Edith Bideau, singer and music educator
 Edwin Bideau, lawyer and politician
 Osa Johnson, adventurer, author, and documentary filmmaker
 Jennifer Knapp, singer-songwriter
 Paul Lindblad, MLB player
 Ralph Miller, basketball coach, Hall of Fame 
 Grace Olive Wiley, herpetologist
 Kustom Amplification, had a factory in Chanute. "Kustom" was a brand of Ross Inc, a company founded in 1964 by Bud Ross in Chanute.

Gallery

See also
 National Register of Historic Places listings in Neosho County, Kansas
 Great Flood of 1951

References

Further reading

External links

 
 Chanute - Directory of Public Officials
 Chanute is the center of Google Earth on the Mac
 Chanute city map, KDOT

Cities in Kansas
Cities in Neosho County, Kansas
Populated places established in 1873
1873 establishments in Kansas